Argyresthia reticulata is a moth of the  family Yponomeutidae. It is found in the Netherlands, France, Switzerland and the Czech Republic. It is an introduced species in Belgium.

The wingspan is 7–10 mm. Adults are on wing from late April to mid-June.

The larvae feed on Juniperus species.

References

Moths described in 1877
Argyresthia
Moths of Europe